Events in the year 2003 in Brazil.

Incumbents

Federal government
 President: Luiz Inácio Lula da Silva 
 Vice President: José Alencar Gomes da Silva

Governors
 Acre: Jorge Viana 
 Alagoas: Ronaldo Lessa 
 Amapa: Waldez Góes (from 1 January)
 Amazonas: Eduardo Braga (from 1 January)
 Bahia: Otto Alencar (till 1 January); Paulo Souto (from 1 January)
 Ceará: Beni Veras (till 1 January); Lúcio Alcântara (from 1 January)
 Espírito Santo: José Ignácio Ferreira (till 1 January); Paulo Hartung (from 1 January)
 Goiás: Marconi Perillo 
 Maranhão: José Reinaldo Tavares
 Mato Grosso: Blairo Maggi (from 1 January)
 Mato Grosso do Sul: José Orcírio Miranda dos Santos
 Minas Gerais: Itamar Franco (till 1 January); Aécio Neves (from 1 January)
 Pará: Almir Gabriel (till 1 January); Simão Jatene (from 1 January)
 Paraíba: Cássio Cunha Lima (from 1 January)
 Paraná: Jaime Lerner (till 1 January); Roberto Requião de Mello e Silva (from 1 January)
 Pernambuco: Jarbas Vasconcelos 
 Piauí: Hugo Napoleão (till 1 January); Wellington Dias (from 1 January)
 Rio de Janeiro: Benedita da Silva then Rosinha Garotinho 
 Rio Grande do Norte: Fernando Antonio Chamber Freire (till 1 January); Wilma Maria de Faria (from 1 January)
 Rio Grande do Sul: Olívio Dutra (till 1 January); Germano Rigotto (from 1 January)
 Rondônia: Ivo Narciso Cassol (from 1 January)
 Roraima: Francisco Flamarion Portela 
 Santa Catarina: Esperidião Amin (till 1 January); Luiz Henrique da Silveira (from 1 January)
 São Paulo: Geraldo Alckmin 
 Sergipe: Albano Franco (till 1 January); João Filho (from 1 January)
 Tocantins: Marcelo Miranda (from 1 January)

Vice governors
 Acre: Edison Simão Cadaxo (till 1 January); Arnóbio Marques de Almeida Júnior (from 1 January)
 Alagoas: Geraldo Costa Sampaio (till 1 January); Luís Abílio de Sousa Neto (from 1 January)
 Amapá: Maria Dalva de Souza Figueiredo (till 1 January); Pedro Paulo Dias de Carvalho (from 1 January)
 Amazonas: Samuel Assayag Hanan (till 1 January); Omar José Abdel Aziz (from 1 January)
 Bahia: Eraldo Tinoco Melo (from 1 January)
 Ceará: Francisco de Queiroz Maia Júnior (from 1 January)
 Espírito Santo: Celso José Vasconcelos (till 1 January); Wellington Coimbra (from 1 January)
 Goiás: Alcides Rodrigues Filho 
 Maranhão: Jurandir Ferro do Lago Filho (from 1 January)
 Mato Grosso: Iraci Araújo Moreira (from 1 January)
 Mato Grosso do Sul: Moacir Kohl (till 1 January), Egon Krakheche (from 1 January)
 Minas Gerais: Newton Cardoso (till 1 January); Clésio Soares de Andrade (from 1 January)
 Pará: Hildegardo de Figueiredo Nunes (till 1 January); Valéria Pires Franco (from 1 January)
 Paraíba: Lauremília Lucena (from 1 January)
 Paraná: Emília de Sales Belinati (till 1 January); Orlando Pessuti (from 1 January)
 Pernambuco: José Mendonça Bezerra Filho 
 Piauí: Felipe Mendes de Oliveira (till 1 January); Osmar Ribeiro de Almeida Júnior (from 1 January)
 Rio de Janeiro: Luiz Paulo Conde (from 1 January)
 Rio Grande do Norte: vacant (till 1 January); Antônio Jácome (from 1 January)
 Rio Grande do Sul: Miguel Soldatelli Rossetto (till 1 January); Antônio Carlos Hohlfeldt (from 1 January)
 Rondônia: Miguel de Souza (till 1 January); Odaísa Fernandes Ferreira (from 1 January)
 Roraima: Salomão Afonso de Souza Cruz (1 January-10 November); Erci de Moraes (from 10 November)
 Santa Catarina: Eduardo Pinho Moreira (from 1 January)
 São Paulo: vacant (till 1 January); Claudio Lembo (from 1 January)
 Sergipe: Benedito de Figueiredo (till 1 January); Marília Mandarino (from 1 January)
 Tocantins: João Lisboa da Cruz (till 1 January); Raimundo Nonato Pires dos Santos (from 1 January)

Events 
January 1 - The sindicalist leader Luiz Inácio Lula da Silva is installed as president of Brazil
 June 20 – A magnitude 7.0 earthquake, the highest recorded in Brazil, happens in Amazonas.
 August 22 – VLS-1 V03 accident: An explosion at the Alcântara Launch Center kills 21 scientists.
 October 20 – Bolsa Família, a unified social welfare program, is introduced.

Births 
 June 21 - Giovana Queiroz, football player

Deaths 
 August 6 – Roberto Marinho, founder of Grupo Globo, the largest mass media company in Brazil and Latin America (b. 1904)

References

See also 
2003 in Brazilian football
2003 in Brazilian television
List of Brazilian films of 2003

 
2000s in Brazil
Years of the 21st century in Brazil
Brazil
Brazil